A synalepha or synaloepha  is the merging of two syllables into one, especially when it causes two words to be pronounced as one.

The original meaning in Ancient Greek is more general than modern usage and includes coalescence of vowels within a word. Similarly, synalepha most often refers to elision (as in English contraction), but it can also refer to coalescence by other metaplasms: synizesis, synaeresis or crasis.

Examples

Spanish, Portuguese and Italian use synalepha, which is important in counting syllables in poetry. An example is in this hendecasyllable (11-syllable line) by Garcilaso de la Vega:

 Los cabellos que al oro oscurecían.
 The hair that endarkened the gold.

The words que and al form one syllable in counting them because of synalepha. The same thing happens with -ro and os- and so the line has eleven syllables (syllable boundaries are shown by a dot):

 Los·ca·be·llos·queal·o·roos·cu·re·cí·an.

See also 
 Metaplasm
 Elision—Contraction (grammar)
 Apheresis (initial)
 Syncope (medial)
 Apocope (final)
 Crasis
 Synizesis (merge into one syllable without change in writing)
 Synaeresis—opposite Diaeresis
 Correption

Notes

Figures of speech
Phonology